Orasa Thiangkathok (born 18 June 1998) is a Thai canoeist. She represented Thailand at the 2020 Summer Olympics in Tokyo, competing in the women's C-1 200 metres event.

References

External links
 

 

1998 births
Living people
Orasa Thiangkathok
Orasa Thiangkathok
Canoeists at the 2020 Summer Olympics
Orasa Thiangkathok
Canoeists at the 2018 Asian Games